"The Busboy" is the 17th episode of Seinfeld to air, despite being the eighth produced. The episode was the 12th and final episode of the show's second season. It aired on June 26, 1991.

Plot
Jerry, George, and Elaine are at dinner when a menu on an adjacent table catches on fire. George puts it out and explains to the manager that the busboy, Antonio (David Labiosa), left the menu too close to a lit candle. Elaine jokingly declares she is never eating there again. The manager gets in an argument with the busboy and immediately fires him. Elaine and especially George fear their remarks may have caused the firing.

George and Kramer visit Antonio's ramshackle apartment to apologize, much to George's discomfort. Things get only worse when they accidentally leave the door open, allowing Antonio's cat to escape. They also break a lamp. A few days later, Antonio comes to Jerry's apartment to see George, who is terrified that he has come for revenge. Instead, Antonio tells him that there was a gas line explosion at the restaurant that killed five employees, including the busboy hired to replace him. Moreover, his search for his cat was both successful and led him to stumble upon a better-paying job. He thanks George for inadvertently saving his life and getting him a better job.

Elaine has a boyfriend in town staying with her for a week. She quickly grows to hate him and is anxious to put him on a plane back to Seattle. They oversleep and her frantic drive to JFK International Airport is thwarted by a five-car pileup on Rockaway Boulevard. With her boyfriend still with her, he gets into a shouting match and eventually a fistfight in the hallway of Jerry's apartment building with Antonio, resulting in injuries on both sides after they fall down several flights of stairs. The busboy loses his new job, George is forced to take care of the cat, and Elaine's boyfriend is bedridden at her apartment for several more days.

Production
This episode was noted by the supporting cast in an interview used for a DVD set as the first sign that Jerry would be a generous writer, being very good about including the co-stars into simultaneous story lines. Jerry himself does not have a lead role in either of the episode's plots.

Larry David credits this episode as the first time that multiple storylines intertwined.

This episode was filmed in October 1990, simultaneously with "The Pony Remark" and "The Ex-Girlfriend".

In popular culture
In this episode, George claims to know the best public toilets anywhere in Manhattan. In the seventh season of Curb Your Enthusiasm, the fictional version of Larry David wrote a Seinfeld reunion special that had George parlaying this knowledge into an iPhone app called "iToilet", which the fictionalized version of Jerry would describe as "An iPhone application that leads you via your GPS to the nearest acceptable toilet wherever you are in the world".

Reception 
The episode currently has a mixed-to-negative reception. David Sims of The A.V. Club gave the episode a C+.

It was ranked fifth on a list of Seinfelds "Not-so-top episodes", compiled by the New York Daily News, choosing the best and worst five episodes of the series.

References

External links 
 

Seinfeld (season 2) episodes
1991 American television episodes
Television episodes written by Larry David
Television episodes written by Jerry Seinfeld